Doliops similis is a species of beetle in the family Cerambycidae. It was described by Miwa and Mitono in 1933.

References

Doliops
Beetles described in 1933